Life is Feudal is video game franchise set in a fictional Medieval world, developed by Bitbox Ltd. On top of their two flagship titles - Life is Feudal: Your Own and Life is Feudal: MMO, Bitbox Ltd have expanded the franchise by publishing other titles, such as MindIllusion's title, Forest Village.

Development 
During the late winter of 2014, the indie team - which later became Bitbox Ltd - had created a working tech demo for the concept of Life is Feudal: MMO, showcasing many of the main gameplay features, such as real time multiplayer, terraforming, and objects construction.

After finding an investor, development continued for two years, with a team of originally five that grew to fifteen during this period of time.

Both Life is Feudal: Your Own (LiF:YO) and Life is Feudal: MMO (LiF:MMO) shared many of the core mechanics and gameplay, leading to a largely shared codebase for both games being developed simultaneously. Life is Feudal: Your Own was first launched by Bitbox Ltd. on the gaming platform Steam in September 2014 under the Early Access program, reaching Steam's ‘Top Ten’ within two weeks. Within a month, Life is Feudal: Your Own sold over 100,000 copies and continued to rise in popularity.

Life is Feudal: Your Own was released out of Early Access on 17 November 2015, including a trailer and launch cutscene narrated by Sean Bean. While the game had originally used DirectX 9 for its rendering API, the release introduced a new graphical overhaul using DirectX11, along with many new mechanics, balancing tweaks and bug fixes. The game is, as of November 2016, still being actively supported by the development team, with numerous patches introducing further features and improvements on the existing game.

After the release of Life is Feudal: Your Own, Bitbox Ltd. began the transition into a larger team focusing on Life is Feudal: MMO. Closed beta tests for the game began during the second half of 2016. Bitbox Ltd. also announced a partnership with Xsolla in support of Life is Feudal: MMO.

In 2016, Bitbox Ltd. also published another game as part of the Life is Feudal franchise; Life is Feudal: Forest Village, currently being developed by the studio MindIllusion and available on Steam Early Access. Life is Feudal: Forest Village is an alternative take on a similar scenario to the one facing players in previous titles - in this game, the player assumes control of a settlement of villagers, leading them through a survival simulation, with aspects such as seasonal changes, vegetation and illness presenting problems that threaten the village's stability.

Life is Feudal: Your Own 

In Life is Feudal: Your Own, the player is given an open ended starting point on a 9 square kilometers map, from which they must gather necessary resources to survive. Mechanics such as hunger, wild animals and player vs. player combat are the most immediate threats to players, encouraging co-operation with other nearby players in order to gain an advantage. Players can also build structures, weapons and armour, as well as breeding a variety of animals.

Life is Feudal: Your Own allows up to 64 players to join a private or public hosted server, with a variety of configurable options, many of which can be fine-tuned in the game's hosting interface. An executable to run a dedicated server is also offered. Recent updates to LIF:YO have made the gameplay an almost mirror copy of the MMO, where it once operated like two completely different entities. This has given the opportunity for players to switch back and forth between the two platforms without having to relearn the mechanics entirely. However, some strife has arisen due to the implementation of "regional" resource requirements for end game buildings, armor, etc. For LIF:YO players, it is now imperative to work as a team or trade with others in order to utilize the full skill and tech tree options.

Life is Feudal: MMO 

Life is Feudal: MMO was a multiplayer sandbox RPG with survival aspects. Described as a "real life Medieval simulator MMO", the game featured a 21 km x 21 km world inspired by the cold regions of Northern Europe. Life is Feudal: MMO took place in a realistic feudal setting where players worked their way up from scavenging for materials and shelter to becoming a leader of a guild. The game featured a crafting system, building features, and terraforming across the map - meaning players could build their own house and town anywhere in the world.

The game premiered in 2017 and shut down in January 2021.

Aftermath of LIF: MMO Shutdown 2021 

Since the shutdown of the MMO, all further updates and progress have ceased. No word from BitBox LTD and since then, their company website has gone offline. The LIF Website is still active, but there have been no responses from developers to anyone for some time. Recently, more and more have changed their position involving the game on the Steam Community, as the LIF:YO has become further unstable, with no recent patches in sight. Between many glaring bugs and an ever increasing toxic community, it is unlikely any further development will be seen in the future.

https://lifeisfeudal.com/forum/what-killed-this-game-and-is-it-worth-rejoining-t51047/

References

2015 video games
Massively multiplayer online role-playing games
Multiplayer online games
Windows games
Windows-only games
Video games developed in Russia